Dustin Brown and Martin Emmrich were the defending champions but decided not to participate together.
Brown plays alongside Michael Kohlmann, while Emmrich partners up with Andreas Siljeström.
They went on to win the title after defeating James Cerretani and Michal Mertiňák 6–4, 6–4 in the final.

Seeds

Draw

Draw

References
 Main Draw

IPP Open - Doubles
IPP Open